Tough Love is a 2017 Nigerian romantic drama film, produced and directed by Biodun Stephen.

The film tells a story of a United States returnee, Obaoluwa who is tricked into returning to his hometown in Abeokuta by his mother to seek alternative ways of keeping him away from substance abuse.  Despite having difficulty adapting to his new life, the firm approach of his grandmum, and the continued love from a farm girl, Monike ensured he gradually changed his way of life.

Cast 
 Bolaji Ogunmola as Monike
 Joshua Richard as Obaloluwa 
 Lawal Solomon
 Blessing Jessica Obasi
 Vivian Metchie as Iya Ola
 Tomiwa Sage

Reception 
It got a 3/5 rating from Nollywood Reinvented, who praised the performance of Vivian Metchie, but criticized the lack of chemistry and display of love progression between Joshua Richard and Bolaji Ogunmola. It also questioned the position of the makers of the film on human rights for justifying the relinquishment of rights to freedom of movement and the use of domestic corporal punishment for an adult. True Nollywood Stories captioned its review "Tough Love" is a simple, well-told story that will move your heart. However, it noted that there were many unnecessary scenes in the film and the character buildup was not convincing. It praised the music and the acting of the main characters.

Release 
In June 2018, YNaija announced that the film is set for release on video streaming platform, Irokotv.

References 

Films about freedom of expression
Nigerian romantic drama films
Films about drugs
2017 films
Films set in Abeokuta